The York Light Infantry Volunteers, also known as the Barbados Volunteer Emigrants, was a foreign light infantry regiment of the British Army during the Napoleonic Wars. It was formed in September 1803 from the Dutch garrisons of the captured Batavian colonies of Demerara, Essequibo, and Berbice. Additions to the regiment were recruited from the ranks of prisoners of war, and the regiment was also the recipient of the majority of deserters taken in the Peninsular Wars. The regiment served its whole existence in the West Indies, fighting in the British West Indies campaign. It was present at the Battle of Suriname in 1804 and at the invasions of Martinique and Guadeloupe in 1809 and 1810 respectively. It finished the Napoleonic Wars as garrison at Jamaica, before in early 1817 being sent to England, where it was disbanded on 19 March.

Formation

The Batavian Republic was formed in 1795 from Holland as a puppet state to the French First Republic. The ousted William V, Prince of Orange, went into exile in England. There he formed the Dutch Emigrant Brigade from troops who had stayed loyal to him, however those Dutch soldiers serving at the time in their colonies of Surinam, Berbice, Essequibo, and Demerara refused to allow their charges to be taken over by William's new British allies. Subsequently, in 1796 Demerara and Essequibo were captured by the British and garrisoned. The Dutch soldiers stationed in these two colonies then defected to the British cause, becoming the Loyal Orange Brigade. Surinam and Berbice were left in Batavian hands.

When the French Revolutionary Wars ended in March 1802 with the Peace of Amiens, Demerara and Essequibo were given back to Batavian control. The local population of the colonies was, however, unhappy with the renewed or continued Batavian rule. The French colonial administrator Victor Hughes had recently visited the Dutch colonies, worrying them that in case of war combat in their lands would see devastation equal to that seen at the invasion of Guadeloupe in 1794. To avoid this the Dutch appealed to Britain for protection.

When the Napoleonic Wars began in May 1803 the Dutch regular soldiers garrisoning Berbice mutinied against the republicans, hoisting the Union Jack. The uprising was eventually put down after heavy fighting. On 16 September a British force under Lieutenant-General William Grinfield arrived at Georgetown and offered terms of surrender to the colonies. Demerara and Essequibo capitulated on 20 September and Berbice followed five days later. Surinam was, as in 1796, left untouched. Having shown their disinterest in serving Batavia and with the likely alternative being starvation, over 1,000 Dutch soldiers, mostly from the Berbice garrison, chose to join the British Army.

Service
While some of the Dutch volunteers were recruited into the 60th Regiment of Foot, a majority were taken to the British stronghold of Barbados, where they were formed into the Barbados Volunteer Emigrants later in September by Colonel Fitzroy Maclean. This new unit was organised into ten companies with a total strength of 1,804. The name of the regiment was changed to the York Light Infantry Volunteers (YLIV) in January 1804. New officers for the regiment were brought in from other British units already serving in the West Indies. The lieutenant-colonel, Francis Streicher, came from the 60th, while the senior major, Francis Geraghty, was from the 6th West India Regiment. Many of the subalterns were non commissioned officers who had been commissioned from the ranks. While the majority of officers were British, two lieutenants were taken from the original Batavian forces.

The YLIV were officially accepted onto the British establishment on 25 March 1804. In April an expedition including the regiment was brought together to finally capture the remaining Batavian colony, Surinam, which was not expected to surrender easily as its neighbours had. The expedition arrived off Surinam on 25 April, and after the capital New Amsterdam was outflanked in the Battle of Suriname, the Dutch governor surrendered on 3 May. The regiment is not recorded as part of any of the notable events of the expedition. While the majority of the regiment was armed with slightly shortened muskets, around this time one company carried rifles.

In the following year the regiment was sent to garrison Barbados and Dominica. On 22 February a French force invaded Dominica, where the YLIV contingent was stationed at Scotts Head. The gun battery there fought off two French ships of the line but the garrison had provisions for only one week, and so in the evening they retreated to St Rupert's Bay. From there the garrisons of the island were brought together in strength around Fort Cabrit, which the French were unable to capture, choosing instead to sail to Guadeloupe.

The regiment continued in its garrison role for several years, in 1807 being recorded at a strength of 650 men, still in the original ten companies. As the British West Indies campaign continued, 350 men of the unit fought in the 4th Brigade of Major-General Frederick Maitland's 2nd Division at the invasion of Martinique in 1809. The division landed at Sainte-Luce on 30 January, meeting no resistance as they reached Lamentin on 2 February. They then arrived at the heavily defended Fort Desaix a day later, entrenching nearby to cover a possible landing place. On 5 February the division moved on to the capital Fort-de-France, participating in its siege. The French surrendered on 24 February. Later in the year the regiment served onboard Royal Navy warships as part of the blockading fleet operating off Guadeloupe.

In 1810 a detachment of 200 men from the regiment participated in the invasion of Guadeloupe. Part of the 4th Brigade of Major-General Thomas Hislop's 1st Division, they left Dominica on 16 January and arrived at Capesterre-Belle-Eau two days later. They landed on 27 January. The division marched south without issue and reached Trois-Rivières, where the French defenders abandoned their defensive positions. The division stayed there to assist with landing provisions until 2 February, when they occupied the Palmiste heights east of the capital of Basseterre.

The French had positioned themselves in mountains to the north-east of the town. At dawn on 4 February the YLIV and the 1st West India Regiment's light company were sent to take the strategic Bridge of Voziere, over the Noire River, to the right of the French. They were spotted by a picket but stormed the bridge despite this, capturing the position. With other units having also crossed the river, heavily pushing the defenders back on the left, the French surrendered on 6 February. During this time the regiment continued to grow in numbers from its nadir of 1807, and in October 1810 was recorded at 1,290 men in twelve companies.

The regiment subsequently continued to expand, most likely because of heavy recruitment from French prisoners of war and because the majority of deserters from the Peninsular War were sent to it; in 1811 it numbered 1,543 men. In the same year the regiment was put back on garrison duty. Split in half, it was sent to Antigua and Barbados. In December 1814 the regiment was brought back together to serve as a whole in the Jamaica garrison. Lieutenant-Colonel Edward O'Hara assumed command on 15 June 1815, and left the unit on 25 July 1816. Still at Jamaica, the regiment was reduced in size in December, lowering to 1,077 men in ten companies. The regiment continued at Jamaica until early 1817 when it was sent to Britain. The YLIV arrived at Harwich in March and were disbanded on the 19th of that month, by then being commanded by Lieutenant-Colonel Alexander Mackenzie.

Uniform

The York Light Infantry Volunteers wore green uniforms with black facings and white crossbelts, based on that of the 95th Rifles. While green was the traditional colour of rifle regiments, it was not exclusively worn by them. The collar, cuffs, and shoulder straps were black with white lace, with white metal buttons for the other ranks and silver for the officers. The uniform style was similar to that of the Dutch Emigrant Brigade, with the blue-grey trousers of the latter being replaced with green. The regiment also had a morning parade dress uniform, which was white with black collar, shoulder straps, and facings. Sashes worn for rank identification were crimson, but did not have the traditional stripe running through them in the colour of the unit's facings. They wore a black stovepipe shako, likely with a bugle badge, until December 1813 when this was changed to the infantry "Belgic" shako. This later shako has been recorded as being white or brown by different sources. While the regiment was designated as light infantry, it carried drums rather than the more traditional bugle alongside its white accoutrements.

Colonels of the Regiment
The following officers served as Colonel of the Regiment:
Barbados Volunteer Emigrants
1803–1804: Colonel Fitzroy Maclean 
York Light Infantry Volunteers
1804–1808: Major-General Sir Charles Green
1808–1809: Major-General Edwin Hewgill
1809–1815: Lieutenant-General Sir Alexander Campbell
1815–1816: Major-General Sir John Byng

Notes and citations

Notes

Citations

References

 
 
 
 
 
 
 
 
 
 
 
 
 
 
 
 
 

Infantry regiments of the British Army
Light Infantry regiments of the British Army
Military units and formations established in 1803
Military units and formations disestablished in 1817
Foreign regiments in British Service